The following lists events that happened during 1822 in Chile.

Incumbents
Supreme Director of Chile: Bernardo O'Higgins

Events

August 
 8 August – Bernardo O'Higgins institutes a new constitution, which is seen by opponents to be an attempt to keep himself in power, leading to O'Higgins being deposed and replaced by Ramón Freire in 1823.

November 
 19 November – Copiapo earthquake
 29 November – Thomas Cochrane leaves the service of the Chilean Navy.

Births
13 October – Joaquín Larraín Gandarillas (d. 1897)
November – José Joaquín Aguirre (d. 1901)

Deaths 
23 February – Vicente Benavides (b. 1777)

References 

 
1820s in Chile
Chile
Chile